

Herbert Denison Cheney (June 6, 1873 – January 13, 1931) was an American football coach and educator. He served as the head football coach at the Academy of Idaho—now known as Idaho State University–from 1902 to 1903, compiling a record of 5–1–1.

Cheney was an 1895 graduate of Ohio Wesleyan University and earned his master's degree in ancient and modern languages from Harvard University in 1899. As of September 1918, Cheney was teaching at Gooding College and living in Gooding, Idaho, with his wife, Edna. Cheney died on January 13, 1931, after being struck by an automobile in Tacoma, Washington, while on his way to teach night classes at the College of Puget Sound—he was survived by his wife, two daughters, and two sons.

Head coaching record

Notes

References

External links
 
 1902 Academy of Idaho football team photograph  via oclc.org (Cheney in back row)

1873 births
1931 deaths
People from Barnstable, Massachusetts
Sportspeople from Massachusetts
Idaho State Bengals football coaches
Harvard Graduate School of Arts and Sciences alumni
Ohio Wesleyan University alumni
University of Puget Sound faculty
Road incident deaths in Washington (state)